The Haines Borough School District is the school district administrating education in both the city of Haines, Alaska, but the Haines Borough as well.

Schools
 Haines High School
 Haines Junior/Elementary School
 Mosquito Lake Elementary School

See also
 List of school districts in Alaska

External links
 Official site

Education in Haines Borough, Alaska
School districts in Alaska